The Movement of Progressives (MDP) formerly known as the Progressive Unitary Movement, is a minor democratic-socialist political party in France.

Their sole MP (Sébastien Nadot) and their sole Senator are sitting along both Radical Party of the Left's parliamentary groups.

References

Political parties established in 2009
Political parties of the French Fifth Republic
Socialist parties in France
2009 establishments in France